Durrington-on-Sea may refer to:

 Durrington, a suburb of Worthing, West Sussex
 Durrington-on-Sea railway station, the station serving Durrington